Bretelin may refer to:
Bretelin village in  Vețel commune, Romania
Bretelin River, a river in Romania